Once - 30 de Diciembre  is a station on Line H of the Buenos Aires Underground and is located at the intersection of Pueyrredón and Rivadavia  avenues in the neighbourhood of Balvanera. From here, passengers may transfer to the Plaza Miserere station on line A and, through it, transfer to the Once railway station, the central terminal of the Domingo Faustino Sarmiento Railway and Sarmiento Line.

Overview
The station was inaugurated on two occasions. The civil engineering was inaugurated 31 May 2007, but the opening for passenger service was held on 18 October 2007. The station was opened as the northern terminus of the inaugural section of the line, with Humberto I, Venezuela, Caseros and Inclán stations. On 6 December 2010 the line was extended to Corrientes.

The Studio of Architects Berdichevsky-Cherny participated In the design of the station.

Gallery
Once station underground hallways to connect with line A at Plaza Miserere station

Nearby
 Plaza Miserere
 Palacio de Aguas Corrientes
 Abasto de Buenos Aires

References

External links

Balvanera
Buenos Aires Underground stations
Railway stations opened in 2007
2007 establishments in Argentina